The 2014 Savannah Challenger was a professional tennis tournament played on clay courts. It was the fifth edition of the tournament which was part of the 2014 ATP Challenger Tour. It took place in Savannah, Georgia, United States between 21 and 27 April 2014.

Singles main-draw entrants

Seeds

Other entrants
The following players received wildcards into the singles main draw:
  Evan King
  Jeff Dadamo
  Noah Rubin
  Robby Ginepri

The following player received entry as a special exempt into the singles main draw:
  Daniel Kosakowski

The following players received entry from the qualifying draw:
  Yoshihito Nishioka
  Thanasi Kokkinakis
  Bjorn Fratangelo
  Jean-Yves Aubone

Doubles main-draw entrants

Seeds

Other entrants
The following pairs received wildcards into the doubles main draw:
  Evan King /  Devin McCarthy
  Collin Altamirano /  Stefan Kozlov
  Robby Ginepri /  Alex Kuznetsov

The following pairs received entry from the qualifying draw:
  David Rice /  Sean Thornley

Champions

Singles

 Nick Kyrgios def.  Jack Sock, 2–6, 7–6(7–4), 6–4

Doubles

 Ilija Bozoljac /  Michael Venus def.  Facundo Bagnis /  Alex Bogomolov Jr., 7–5, 6–2

External links
Official Website

Savannah Challenger
Savannah Challenger
Savannah Challenger
2014 in sports in Georgia (U.S. state)
Tennis tournaments in Georgia (U.S. state)